The southern rock lizard (Australolacerta australis) is a species of lizard in the family Lacertidae. It is endemic to the Western Cape, South Africa. It occurs in fynbos on the rocky mountain slopes.

References

Australolacerta
Lacertid lizards of Africa
Endemic reptiles of South Africa
Taxa named by John Hewitt (herpetologist)
Reptiles described in 1926
Taxonomy articles created by Polbot